Dipogon is a genus of spider wasps of the family Pompilidae in the subfamily Pepsinae. They are found in Europe, Asia, and North America. Their generic name ("two beards") comes from the characteristic long bristle tufts just below the mandibles, which are used to carry material to construct the cells in the nest, and for constructing the nest.

Species in Dipogon include:

Dipogon anasazi Evans, 2000
Dipogon bifasciatus (Geoffroy, 1785)
Dipogon brevis (Cresson, 1867)
Dipogon calipterus (Say, 1836)
Dipogon diablo Wasbauer, 1960
Dipogon fulleri Krombein, 1962
Dipogon geronimo Evans, 1964
Dipogon graenicheri Banks, 1939
Dipogon hurdi Evans, 1964
Dipogon iracundus Townes, 1957
Dipogon kiowa Evans, 2000
Dipogon konza Evans, 2000
Dipogon leechi Wasbauer, 1960
Dipogon lignicolus Evans, 1987
Dipogon melanocephala (Cameron, 1891)
Dipogon paludis Townes, 1957
Dipogon papago Banks, 1943
Dipogon parkeri Wasbauer, 1966
Dipogon populator Fox, 1897
Dipogon pulchripennis (Cresson, 1867)
Dipogon pygmaeus Townes, 1957
Dipogon sayi Banks, 1941
Dipogon sericea Banks, 1944
Dipogon subintermedius (Magretti, 1886)
Dipogon texanus Banks, 1944
Dipogon thoracicus Townes, 1957
Dipogon variegatus (Linnaeus, 1758)

References

Hymenoptera genera
Pepsinae